Manhattan Project National Historical Park is a United States National Historical Park commemorating the Manhattan Project that is run jointly by the National Park Service and Department of Energy. The park consists of three units: one in Oak Ridge, Tennessee, one in Los Alamos, New Mexico and one in Hanford, Washington. It was established on November 10, 2015 when Secretary of the Interior Sally Jewell and Secretary of Energy Ernest Moniz signed the memorandum of agreement that defined the roles that the two agencies had when managing the park.

The Department of Energy had owned and managed most of the properties located within the three different sites. For over ten years, the DoE worked with the National Park Service and federal, state and local governments and agencies with the intention of turning places of importance into a National Historical Park. After several years of surveying the three sites and five other possible alternatives, the two agencies officially recommended a historical park be established in Hanford, Los Alamos and Oak Ridge.

The Department of Energy would continue to manage and own the sites while the National Park Service would provide interpretive services, visitor centers and park rangers. After two unsuccessful attempts at passing a bill in Congress authorizing the park in 2012 and 2013, the House and Senate ultimately passed the bill in December 2014, with President Obama signing the National Defense Authorization Act shortly thereafter which authorized the Manhattan Project National Historical Park.

Sites

The Manhattan Project National Historical Park protects many structures associated with the Manhattan Project, but only some are open for touring.

Hanford, Washington
 B Reactor National Historic Landmark – bus tours are available by advance reservation
 the previous Hanford High School in the former Town of Hanford and Hanford Construction Camp Historic District
  Bruggemann's Agricultural Warehouse Complex
  White Bluffs Bank and Hanford Irrigation District Pump House

Los Alamos, New Mexico

The Los Alamos Visitor Center for the Manhattan Project NHP is located at 475 20th Street in downtown Los Alamos.   This location is open Friday through Monday from 10 am to 3 pm.   It is in the Los Alamos Community Building on the front left as you face the building from the street (next to the Los Alamos Teen Center).  Visitors can learn about the Manhattan Project and related sites in the vicinity.

There are three areas of the park located on Los Alamos National Laboratory property.  These locations are only open to the public by special bus tours organized by the Department of Energy:
 Gun Site Facilities: three bunkered buildings (TA-8-1, TA-8-2, and TA-8-3), and a portable guard shack (TA-8-172).
 V-Site Facilities: TA-16-516 and TA-16-517 V-Site Assembly Building
 Pajarito Site: TA-18-1 Slotin Building, TA-8-2 Battleship Control Building, and the TA-18-29 Pond Cabin.

Oak Ridge, Tennessee
The American Museum of Science and Energy provides bus tours of several buildings in the Clinton Engineer Works including the:
 X-10 Graphite Reactor
 Buildings 9731 and 9204-3 at the Y-12 complex
 East Tennessee Technology Park, located on the site of the K-25 Building

References

External links

Official National Park Service website: Manhattan Project National Historical Park
Official Department of Energy website: Manhattan Project National Historical Park

Manhattan Project
National Historical Parks of the United States
National Park Service areas in New Mexico
National Park Service areas in Tennessee
National Park Service areas in Washington (state)
Hanford Site
Los Alamos, New Mexico
Oak Ridge, Tennessee
Military history of New Mexico
Military history of Tennessee
Protected areas of Anderson County, Tennessee
Protected areas of Benton County, Washington
Protected areas of Los Alamos County, New Mexico
Industrial buildings and structures on the National Register of Historic Places
Parks on the National Register of Historic Places
World War II on the National Register of Historic Places
National Register of Historic Places in Anderson County, Tennessee
National Register of Historic Places in Benton County, Washington
National Register of Historic Places in Los Alamos County, New Mexico
Industrial buildings and structures on the National Register of Historic Places in New Mexico
Industrial buildings and structures on the National Register of Historic Places in Tennessee
Industrial buildings and structures on the National Register of Historic Places in Washington (state)
Military facilities on the National Register of Historic Places in New Mexico
Military facilities on the National Register of Historic Places in Tennessee
Military facilities on the National Register of Historic Places in Washington (state)
Parks on the National Register of Historic Places in Tennessee
Protected areas established in 2015
2015 establishments in New Mexico
2015 establishments in Tennessee
2015 establishments in Washington (state)
Science and technology in New Mexico
Science and technology in Tennessee
Science and technology in Washington (state)